Jinan, alternately romanized as Tsinan, is the capital of Shandong province in Eastern China. With a population of 9.2 million, it is the second-largest city in Shandong. The area of present-day Jinan has played an important role in the history of the region from the earliest beginnings of civilization and has evolved into a major national administrative, economic, and transportation hub. The city has held sub-provincial administrative status since 1994. Jinan is often called the "City of Springs" for its famous 72 artesian springs.

Jinan is one of the top 60 cities in the world for scientific research as tracked by the Nature Index according to the Nature Index 2022 Science Cities. The city is home to several major universities, including Shangdong, Shandong Normal, Shandong Jianzhu, University of Jinan, Qilu University of Technology, Shandong University of Traditional Chinese Medicine and Shandong University of Finance and Economics. Notably, Shandong University is one of China's most prestigious universities as a member of the Double First Class University Plan. The city is rated Beta- (Global second-tier city) by the biannual GAWC ratings in 2020.

Names 
The modern-day name Jinan literally means "south of the Ji" and refers to the old Ji River (濟水) that had flowed to the north of the city until the middle of the 19th century. The Ji River disappeared in 1852 when the Yellow River changed its course northwards and took over its bed. The current pronunciation of the character "Ji" with the third tone ("jǐ") was established in the late 1970s. Prior to this, it was pronounced with the fourth tone (""). Older texts spell the name as "Tsinan" (Wade-Giles romanization) or "Chi-nan".

During the times of the Zhou dynasty (1045 BC to 256 BC), the city of Lixia was the major settlement in the area. The name "Lixia" refers to the location of Jinan at the foot of Mount Li, which lies to the south of the city. Today, Lixia is the name of one of the city's districts.

Marco Polo gives a brief description of Jinan under the name "Chingli" or "Chinangli". 19th and early 20th century texts frequently give the name of the city as "Tsinan Fu" where the additional "Fu" comes from the dated Chinese term for a provincial capital.

Jinan is also referred to by the nickname "City of Springs", because of the many artesian springs in the urban city centre and its surroundings.

History

Early history
The area of present-day Jinan has been inhabited for more than 4000 years. The Neolithic Longshan culture was first discovered at Chengziya to the east of Jinan (Zhangqiu District) in 1928. One of the characteristic features of the Longshan culture are the intricate wheel-made pottery pieces it produced. Most renowned is the black "egg-shell pottery" with wall thicknesses that can go below 1 millimeter.

During the Spring and Autumn period (722–481 BCE) and Warring States period (475–221 BCE), the area of Jinan was split between two states: the state of Lu in the west and the state of Qi in the east. In 685 BCE, the state of Qi started to build the Great Wall of Qi across Changqing county. Portions of the wall still remain today and are accessible as open air museums. Bian Que, according to the legend the earliest Chinese physician and active around 400–300 BCE, is said to have been a native of present-day Changqing County. Zou Yan (305–240 BCE), a native of Zhangqiu City, developed the concepts of Yin-Yang and the Five Elements. Joseph Needham, a British sinologist, describes Zou as "The real founder of all Chinese scientific thought."

During the times of the Han dynasty (206 BCE – 220 CE), Jinan was the capital of the feudatory Kingdom of Jibei and evolved into the cultural and economic hub of the region. The Han dynasty tomb where the last king of Jibei, Liu Kuan, was buried at Shuangru Mountain  was excavated by archaeologists from Shandong University in 1995 and 1996. More than 2000 artifacts such as jade swords, jade masks, and jade pillows have been recovered within the 1,500 square meter excavation site, emphasizing the wealth of the city during the period. Cao Cao (155 – 220 CE) was an official in Jinan before he became the de facto ruler of the Han dynasty. His son, Cao Pi, overthrew the last emperor of the Han and founded the Wei Kingdom (220 – 265 CE) of the Three Kingdoms Period.

Beginning in the 5th century CE, Buddhism flourished in Jinan. The Langgong Temple (later renamed Shentong Temple, (and now in ruins) in the southern county of Licheng was one of the most important temples in northern China at that time. The same period witnessed extensive construction of Buddhist sites in the southern counties of Licheng and Changqing such as the Lingyan Temple and the Thousand-Buddha Cliff. In particular, a large number of cave temples were established in the hills south of Jinan.

Jinan remained the cultural center of the region during the Song dynasty (960 – 1279 CE). The Song rulers promoted Jinan to a superior prefecture in 1116 CE. Two of the most important poets of the Southern Song were both born in Jinan: Li Qingzhao (1084–1151 CE), the most renown female poet in Chinese history, and Xin Qiji (1140–1207 CE), who was also a military leader of the Southern Song dynasty. Both poets witnessed a series of crushing defeats of the Song dynasty at the hands of the Jurchens who gained control over almost half of the Song territories and established the Jin dynasty in northern China. After Jinan came under control of the Jin dynasty, both Li Qingzhao and Xin Qiji had to abandon their homes and reflected this experience in their works.

During the Civil War that followed the proclamation of Kublai Khan as Great Khan in 1260 CE, Jinan was at the center of a rebellion by Yizhou governor Li Tan against Mongol rule in 1262 CE. The rebellion was crushed in a decisive battle that was fought not far from Jinan in late March or early April 1262 CE. After losing 4000 of his troops in the battle, Li Tan retreated to Jinan to make his last stand. After defections of his defenders had made his position untenable, Li Tan tried to commit suicide by drowning himself in Daming Lake. However, he was rescued by the Mongols in order to execute him by trampling him to death with their horses.

Despite such violent conflicts, culture in Jinan continued to thrive during the Jin (1115–1234) and Yuan (1271–1368) dynasties: One of the most renowned artists of the Yuan dynasty, Zhao Mengfu (1254–1322) was appointed to the post of governor of Jinan in 1293 and spent three years in the city. Among the extraordinary art works he completed during his stay in Jinan, the best known painting is "Autumn Colors on the Qiao and Hua Mountains". Geographer Yu Qin (1284–1333) also served as an official in Jinan and authored his geography book Qi Cheng there.

When Shandong province was established under the Ming dynasty, Jinan became its capital. Jinan was the site of a siege during the Jingnan Campaign where the city was defended by loyalists of the Jianwen Emperor led by Tie Xuan against the rebel Prince of Yan Zhu Di's army.

In 1852, the northward shift of the Yellow River into a new bed close to the city triggered the modern expansion of Jinan. The new course of the Yellow River connected the city to the Grand Canal and regional waterways in northern Shandong and southern Hebei.

German influence in Jinan grew after the Qing dynasty ceded Qingdao to the German Empire in 1897. A German concession area was established to the west of the historical city center (in the vicinity of the Jinan Railway Station first established by the Germans). The Jiaoji (Qingdao–Jinan) railway was built by the Germans against local resistance. Discontent over the construction of the railway was one of the sources fueling the Boxer Rebellion (1899–1901). During the rebellion, foreign priests were evacuated from Jinan and Chinese Christians became a target of violence. The Jiaoji railway was completed in 1904, three years after the Boxer Rebellion had been put down, and opened the city to foreign trade. The importance of Jinan as a transportation hub was cemented with the completion of the north–south Jinpu railway from Tianjin to Pukou in 1912. Jinan became a major trading center for agricultural goods in northern China. Traded commodities included cotton, grain, peanuts, and tobacco. Jinan also developed into a major industrial center, second in importance to Qingdao in the province.

Republican era
In 1919, after World War I, the Japanese took over the German sphere of influence in Shandong, including control of the Jiaoji railway, and established a significant Japanese influence in Jinan. According to estimates by a contemporary Japanese government official, about 2,000 Japanese were living in Jinan in 1931, about half of whom were involved in the opium trade for which the Japanese had a loosely controlled monopoly that was exploited with the participation of Chinese traders.

During the Warlord era of the Republic of China, Zhang Zongchang, nicknamed the "Dogmeat General", ruled Shandong from Jinan for a period that lasted from April 1925 until May 1928. Zhang was unpopular for his heavy-handed rule and in particular his heavy taxation. Besides heavy taxes, he relied financially on opium to finance his periodic wars. Zhang even planned to use some of the wealth extracted from these sources for building a living shrine and a large bronze statue for himself on the shore of Daming Lake, but these plans were not realized as his rule came to an end.

In the spring of 1928, the Kuomintang's Northern Expedition reached Jinan. On May 3, 1928, clashes developed between Japanese troops stationed in Jinan and the Kuomintang troops moving into the city (Jinan incident). Cai Gongshi, a Kuomintang emissary sent to negotiate and 16 members of his entourage were cruelly executed by the Japanese. Japanese officers placed an order to slice off his nose and ears, and to gouge out his eyes and tongue. Sixteen other members of his negotiation team were also striped naked, recklessly whipped, dragged to the back-lawn, and slaughtered by machine guns on the same day. After the incident, Japanese reinforcements were sent to Shandong and by 11 May, Japanese troops pushed the Chinese troops from the area, inflicted thousands of casualties and killed over 2000 Chinese civilians. The Japanese occupied Jinan for more than six months until they withdrew to their garrison in Tsingtao on the 28th of March 1929. When Chiang lectured a group of Chinese army cadets, he urged them to turn their energies to washing away the shame of Jinan, but to conceal their hatred until the last moment. The Kuomintang government later decreed that May 3 be designated a "National Humiliation Memorial Day."

During the Nanjing decade of the Republic of China, Han Fuju, a military commander from the warlord era who had aligned himself with the Kuomintang, was rewarded with the military governorship of Shandong, after fighting against the rebel troops of Yen Hsi-shan and his former commander Feng Yu-hsiang in the Central Plains War in 1930. He established his base in Jinan and is credited with curtailing banditry and drug trading, thereby bringing a measure of peace and prosperity to the city. However, from 1935 onwards Han was under heavy pressure from the Japanese consul in Jinan to declare Shandong an "independent state" allied with Japan.

Han Fuju abandoned Jinan the next day against orders to hold the city to the death. He ordered the offices of the provincial government and the Japanese consulate in Jinan to be burned down and the ensuing power vacuum led to widespread looting in the city. Japanese troops from the 10th Division of the Manchurian Area Army entered Jinan on December 27, 1937. Han Fuju was arrested and executed for disobeying orders from superior commanders and retreating on his own accord by Chiang Kai-Shek's chief of staff, General Hu Zongnan.

After World War II
Japanese troops controlled Jinan until their defeat in 1945. After this, the Kuomintang regained short-lived control of the city during the period from 1946 to 1948. The provincial government during this time was led by Lieutenant-General Wang Yaowu, who also commanded the KMT army in the region. KMT rule over Jinan ended in September 1948 with the Battle of Jinan in which units of the People's Liberation Army under the command of Chen Yi took the city. The battle for Jinan took a decisive turn in favor of the attackers when KMT Lieutenant-General Wu Huawen  defected to the Communist side with about 8,000 of his troops. The most likely explanation for his defection is that he had been pressured through relatives of his who were held captive by the Communist forces. Lieutenant-General Wu had been in charge of the vital outer ring of defenses that protected the main airfield, the railroad station, and the commercial district. With these critical assets lost, the situation of the city's defenders became untenable. Following the weakening of the city's defenses, the People's Liberation Army breached the city wall and entered Jinan on September 24, 1948.

Cultural Revolution
In March 1966, the largest among the drawn-out sequence of earthquakes that made up the Xingtai earthquake damaged about 36,000 houses in Jinan.

On May 27, 1966, the Cultural Revolution started in Jinan with an article in the local newspaper "Jinan Evening News" that denounced vice-governor Yu Xiu as a Bourgeois agent within the government. Starting from early June 1966, the schools in Jinan were closed down by strikes as teachers were "struggled against". At the same time, big-character posters started to appear in the city. Red Guards took to the streets of Jinan from late August 1966 onwards, damaging cultural heritage and setting up courts to prosecute perceived enemies of the revolution. In the spring of 1967, the "May 7th Incident" took place: When Zhang Chunqiao and Yao Wenyuan, both later reviled as members of the Gang of Four, visited Jinan to support the Cultural Revolution and its local leader Wang Xiao Yu, fighting erupted in the front of the provincial government between two rival factions of the Cultural Revolution, the "April 22nd Group" and Wang Xiao Yu's "April 28th Group". In the end, more than 10,000 people had been involved in the fighting. On October 11, 1967, the tallest statue of Mao Zedong in Shandong province was erected on the campus of Shandong Normal University. On September 17, 1968, a large assembly of Jinan workers celebrated the arrival of a mango fruit in the "August 1st" Meeting Hall. The fruit had been a gift to the workers in Beijing by Mao and was subsequently passed on to the workers in Jinan. In November 1968, Wang Xiao Yu began to agitate against the local army units in Jinan and Shandong Province. By then unrest due to the Cultural Revolution had severely damaged the city's governmental and industrial infrastructure, with about 80 percent of all government institutions shut down. Large public protests were staged on April 4 and 5, 1969, in which approximately 500,000 people protested the occupation of Zhenbao Island by the Soviet Union. On July 29, 1970, the leadership of the Cultural Revolution passed a resolution to make sweeping changes to the city's educational system: The liberal arts departments of Shandong University were moved to Qufu and combined with Qufu Normal College to form a new Shandong University. The biology department was moved to Tai'an and merged into the Shandong Agricultural College. The rest of the sciences were to form the Shandong Science and Technology University. Shandong Normal University was to be moved to Liaocheng. Shandong Medical College and Shandong College of Traditional Chinese Medicine were to be merged and moved to Tai'an. Shandong University was restored in its original form and the "Shandong Science and Technology University" was abolished in early 1974. The first reversals of Cultural Revolution policies started in early 1971: On May 23 of that year, the Shandong Provincial Museum was reopened after having been closed for about 5 years (since May 1966). In the next year, the Jinan Committee for the Cultural Revolution officially reverted the name changes of four city districts enacted in 1966. During the 6 years between the name change and its reversal, Lixia District had been known officially as "Hongwei", Tianqiao as "Face the Sun", Huaiyin as "East Wind", and Shizhong as "Red Flag". As the Cultural Revolution came to an end, Jinan started to receive visitors from abroad. For example, it was visited by a delegation from the United States Congress between August 8 and 11, 1975. On September 18, 1976, Mao's death was mourned by about 600,000 people at an official service in Jinan's August 1 Square.

Post 1990s
Jinan was the host of the 11th All China Games during October 2009. These games are the selection games for the Chinese Olympic champions. For this occasion, security was heightened and a full volunteer force was out on the streets directing visitor traffic. The city conducted major renovations in its transportation and recreation services in anticipation of the Games' visitors. In early January 2019, the State Council of the People's Republic of China approved the approval of Shandong Province to adjust the administrative division of Laiwu City and Jinan City, cancel Laiwu City, and all jurisdiction of former Laiwu City belongs to Jinan City; establish Laiwu District of Jinan City to replace the former Laicheng District of Laiwu City with the same administrative area; establish Gangcheng District of Jinan City to replace the former Gangcheng District of Laiwu City with the same administrative area.

Climate

Jinan has a humid subtropical climate (Köppen: Cwa), considering a normal isotherm of −3 °C, or a humid continental climate (Köppen: Dwa), considering an isotherm of 0 °C but favoring the former, with four well-defined seasons. The city is dry and nearly rainless in spring, hot and rainy in summer, crisp in autumn and dry and cold (with little snow) in winter. With monthly percent possible sunshine ranging from 48 percent in July to 63 percent in May, the city receives 2,547 hours of bright sunshine annually.

Due to the mountains to the south of the city, temperature inversions are common, occurring on about 200 days per year. The high precipitation for northern Chinese standards, in tandem with the topography (mountains surrounding the city on three sides), leads to particularly oppressive summer weather and the city being named as a candidate for the fourth "furnace", c.e. Three Furnaces.

Air quality

According to the National Environmental Analysis released by Tsinghua University and The Asian Development Bank in January 2013, Jinan is one of ten most air polluted cities in the world. Also according to this report, 7 of 10 most air polluted cities are in China, including Taiyuan, Beijing, Urumqi, Lanzhou, Chongqing, Jinan and Shijiazhuang. As air pollution in China is at an all-time high, several northern cities are among the most polluted cities and have some of the worst air quality in China. Reporting on China's air quality has been accompanied by what seems like a monochromatic slideshow of the country's several cities smothered in thick smog. According to a survey made by "Global voices China" in February 2013, Jinan is among China's 10 most polluted cities, and is the only Shandong city to be on this list. Other cities on the blacklist includes major Chinese cities like Beijing, Shijiazhuang, Zhengzhou, and 6 other prefectural cities all in Hebei Province. These cities are all situated in traditional geographic subdivision of "Huabei (North China) Region".

A lack of cold air flow, combined with slow-moving air masses carrying industrial emissions, collected airborne pollutants to form a thick layer of smog over the region. Officials blamed the dense pollution on lack of wind, automobile exhaust emissions under low air pressure, and coal-powered district heating system in North China region. Prevailing winds blew low-hanging air masses of factory emissions (mostly SO2) towards China's east coast.

Administrative divisions 

The sub-provincial city of Jinan has direct jurisdiction over ten districts and 2 counties after the annexation of Laiwu to Jinan in 2019:

These are further divided into 146 township-level divisions, including 65 towns, 27 townships and 54 subdistricts.

Economy

With the shift of the Yellow River to a new bed right to the north of Jinan (in 1852) and the establishment of a railroad hub, the city became a major market for agricultural products from the productive farming regions to the north.
Following the trade in agricultural goods, the city developed a textile and clothing industry, flour mills, oil presses, as well as factories producing paper, cement, and matches. In the 1950s, large iron and steel works as well as chemical factories were established around Jinan. The large metal works produce pig iron, ingot steel, as well as finished steel. In 2008, steel manufacturing was restructured with the formation of the Shandong Iron and Steel Group.
In the 1970s, Sinotruk established its headquarters and factories for the production of trucks and construction vehicles in the city.

Industrial zones include:
Jinan High-tech Industrial Development Zone
Founded in 1991, the Jinan High-tech Industrial Development zone was one of the first of its kind approved by the State Council.
Since its foundation, the Jinan High-tech Industrial Development Zone has attracted enterprises as LG, Panasonic, Volvo, and Sanyo. In 2000, it joined the world science and technology association and set up a China-Ukraine High-tech Cooperation Park. The Qilu Software Park became the sister park of Bangalore park of India.
Jinan Export Processing Zone
The export processing zone is located in the eastern suburbs of Jinan, to the east of the Jinan High-tech Industrial Development Zone and to the north of the Jiwang highway.

Demographics

As of the 2020 Chinese census, its total population (including Laiwu City merged recently) was 9,202,432 inhabitants and its built-up (or metro) area made of 6 out of 10 urban districts (Jiyang, Zhangqiu, Laiwu and Gangcheng not yet conurbated) was home to 5,452,335 inhabitants, most of them with Han ethnicity.

Shopping centers
Most shopping malls in Jinan are in the downtown area centered around City of Springs Square and Quancheng Road. City of Springs Square was built by the municipal government beside the city moat in the early 21st century

City of Springs Road was rebuilt at the same time that City of Springs Square was created. The government's intention was to create a modern business district and yet preserve the traditional Chinese culture. Therefore, newly built shopping malls with traditional Chinese architectural styles and modern western skyscrapers can be found side by side along City of Springs Road. Notable retail businesses are Quancheng Bookstore – the largest bookstore of the city – and Walmart (near the western end of City of Springs Road). Major shopping malls along the road are the Guihe Shopping Center, the Sofitel Silver Plaza, the Shimao international shopping center, and the Wanda Shopping Mall. Parc 66 to the south of City of Springs Road (opposite of Water Lily Street), opened in August 2011, is Jinan's largest shopping mall with seven levels of retail space and a total gross floor area of 171,000 square meters.

Transportation

Railways

Jinan is positioned at the intersection of two major railways: The Jinghu Railway that runs from Beijing to Shanghai is the major north–south backbone of the railway system in eastern China. In Jinan, it intersects with the Jiaoji Railway that connects Jinan to the sea port of Qingdao to the east. In addition, the Hanji Railway connects Jinan to the city of Handan (Hebei Province) in the west.
Within Shandong province, the Jinghu Railway connects Jinan with the cities of Dezhou, Tai'an, Jining, and Zaozhuang; the Jiaoji Railway provides a link to the cities of Zibo, Qingdao, and Weifang; the Hanji Railway serves the cities of Yancheng and Liaocheng.

Central Jinan is served by Jinan railway station, Jinan East railway station, and Daminghu railway station (just by Daming Lake).

The Beijing–Shanghai high-speed railway calls at Jinan West railway station, which is outside the central metropolitan center and is in suburban western Jinan's Huaiyin District. Since it opened for public service on 30 June 2011, it has become a future hub with west–east running high speed railways to Taiyuan, Shijiazhuang and Qingdao. Jinan East railway station opened in 2018. An additional station, Jinan North railway station, is planned.

Metro

Started by construction in 2013, Jinan Metro opened in 2019. Currently, Lines 1, 2 and 3 are operational, and has 40 stations.

Expressways
Major expressways include China National Highway 104, China National Highway 220, and China National Highway 309. Because of Jinan's location and role as a road and rail transportation hub, the Jinan Coach Terminus has one of the largest passenger flows nationally. On peak travel days, as many as 92,000 passengers per day have been counted, on off-peak days the number is around 42,000 passengers per day.

Airport
The airport is connected to the city center of Jinan by expressways. It has domestic flights to many of the major cities in China as well as to international destinations, in particular Helsinki, Osaka, Seoul, Paris, Bangkok and Singapore.

Buses
The conventional buses in the city have air-conditioned and non-air-conditioned buses. Air-conditioned lines have a K prefix on their route numbers. From 2018, most lines are air-conditioned lines (Include lines without K perfix). These lines comprise more than 200 routes covering the whole city.

Culture and contemporary life

Dialect
Local residents in the city proper, as well as in the surrounding areas, have traditionally spoken the Jinan dialect of Mandarin that is not readily understood even by native speakers of standard Mandarin. The younger people of Jinan are more likely to speak standard Mandarin, whereas many older residents retain strong local dialect elements in their speech. Nevertheless, even the younger residents of Jinan tend to retain a strong local accent and mix local vocabulary into the standardized Mandarin vocabulary. Due to the influx of migrant workers during the past decade of China's economic boom, many of the current population that are of working age are not natives of Jinan but have learned to understand the Jinan dialect.

Cuisine
Jinan has its own cuisine, the Jinan style of the Shandong cuisine, one of the Eight Culinary Traditions of China. One of its features is the use of soup in its dishes. Modern cuisines in northern China —Beijing, Tianjin and the northeastern regions including Heilongjiang, Jilin and Liaoning— are all branches of Shandong cuisine.

Shopping centers
Most shopping malls in Jinan are in the downtown area centered around City of Springs Square and Quancheng Road. City of Springs Square was built by the municipal government beside the city moat in the early 21st century; at the center is the statue "Spring" which has become a symbol of Jinan. The square borders on the ancient city moat. It has a music fountain, a 46,000 square meter underground shopping center and a memorial hall with statues of famous people from Shandong.

Most shopping malls in Jinan are in the downtown area centered around City of Springs Square and Quancheng Road. City of Springs Square was built by the municipal government beside the city moat in the early 21st century
	
City of Springs Road was rebuilt at the same time that City of Springs Square was created. The government's intention was to create a modern business district and yet preserve the traditional Chinese culture. Therefore, newly built shopping malls with traditional Chinese architectural styles and modern western skyscrapers can be found side by side along City of Springs Road. Notable retail businesses are Quancheng Bookstore – the largest bookstore of the city – and Walmart (near the western end of City of Springs Road). Major shopping malls along the road are the Guihe Shopping Center, the Sofitel Silver Plaza, the Shimao international shopping center, and the Wanda Shopping Mall. Parc 66 to the south of City of Springs Road (opposite of Water Lily Street), opened in August 2011, is Jinan's largest shopping mall with seven levels of retail space and a total gross floor area of 171,000 square meters.

Main tourist attractions

Jinan is renowned across China for its numerous springs, the lakes fed by the spring water, and the weeping willows that grow along the water edges. The late-Qing author Liu E describes Jinan's cityscape in his novel "The Travels of Lao Can" (written 1903–04, published in 1907) as "Every family has spring water, every household has a willow tree". Jinan was also the historical center of Buddhist culture for the whole province which is still manifest in the many historic sites that are left behind in its southern counties.

Springs and lakes
Jinan is known as the "City of Springs" because of the large number of natural artesian springs. The majority of the springs, many of which have been historically listed under the "72 Famous Springs" are concentrated in the downtown district and flow north to converge in Daming Lake. The Baotu Spring Park is the most popular of the springs in the City of Jinan proper. Besides the Baotu Spring, the park contains several other springs that are listed among the "72 Famous Springs". "Bào tū" means "jumping and leaping" in Chinese. The water in the spring pool can be seen foaming and gushing, looking like a pot of boiling water. The spring was visited by the Qianlong Emperor (1711–1799) of the Qing dynasty who declared it "the best spring under the heaven". A tablet with the Emperor's handwriting "Baotu Spring" has since been erected beside the spring pool.

Not far away to the northeast of Baotu Spring Park is the Daming Lake, which, together with Baotu Spring and the Thousand-Buddha Mountain is often regarded as the "Three Greatest Attractions in Jinan". Other notable parks in the city include the Five Dragon Pool near the Baotu Spring Park, the Black Tiger Spring on the southern city moat, and the Baimai Springs of Zhangqiu City to the east of Jinan.

Museums and libraries

The Shandong Provincial Museum located at the foothill of Thousand-Buddha Mountain is the largest museum in the province. It has a large collection of natural as well as historical treasures from the whole province. The museum was established in its present form in 1982 and currently has 8 exhibition halls : "Treasures of Shandong Province"; "Stone Sculptures"; "Warship of the Ming dynasty"; "Ancient Coins"; "Art Treasures"; "Fossil Collections"; "Dinosaurs"; and "Specimens". The museum has more than 210,000 relics and specimens, making up ⅓ of the collections in museums of whole province.

The Jinan Municipal Museum  is located at the south-western foot of the Thousand-Buddha Mountain, in the north of the city center. Although much smaller than the provincial museum, the municipal museum still houses a collection of more than 20,000 items, most of which were recovered in the city area.

The Shandong Art Museum is a large museum of fine arts built near the Provincial Museum.

The Shandong Provincial Library  in the eastern High-tech Park (address: 2912 Second Ring East Road) is the principal library of the province and is ranked among the Top 10 Chinese libraries. , the library had more than 5.18 million documents, many of which date back many centuries and are important sources for research on Chinese history. The library also has a large collection of western journals/books. Originally, the library was built close to Daming Lake in 1909 by the then governor of Shandong. In the late 1990s, a project was undertaken to move the library to the eastern part of the city, and it reopened in 2002 with 35 reading rooms and more than 2000 seats.

Parks and Nature Reserves 
Jinan Hundred Miles Yellow River Scenic Area is located in No.166 Luokou Huancheng Road in Tianqiao District. It is designed as an ecological cultural theme park which focuses on ecological tourism, cultural tourism, and healthy tourism. The Yellow River of this section stretches 51.98 kilometers. Jinan Hundred Miles Yellow River Scenic Area was awarded the title "Fifty Scenes of the Yellow River in China" on September 12, 2018. The Levee extending along the Yellow River in this scenery area, is praised as "the Great Wall over water".

Yellow River Forest Park (Jinan) is located on the north bank of the Yellow River. The Yellow River Forest Park sprawls over 1500mu (100 hectares) and has 300,000 trees of various breeds. Yellow River Forest Park is the only park equipping with a forest racecourse, which has a course of 3 Li (unit), in Jinan City. Yellow River Forest Park provides not only an area covering 5000 square meters for visitors to freely barbecue but also a fishing pond covering 1,800 square meters. Visitors can participate in various activities here, such as roller skating, cue sports, table tennis, archery, shooting, etc.

Daming Lake Park is located in the center of Jinan City, covering an area of 46.5 hectares. Daming Lake Park is considered one of the three must-see tourist spots of Jinan (the others are Baotu Spring Park and Thousand Buddha Mountain). Daming Lake Park has many scenic spots, such as the Daming Lake and the Lixia Pavilion. Daming Lake is a natural lake consisting of many springs. It is unique because the lake has constant water level unaffected by heavy rains or drought. Lixia Pavilion, which was built in the Northern Wei period, is in the center of the Daming Lake. There are so many ancient buildings in Daming Lake Park that it has a title describing them, which is "One terrace, three gardens, three towers, four ancestral halls, six isles, seven bridges and ten pavilions".

Education and research
Jinan is one of the top 60 cities in the world for scientific research as tracked by the Nature Index according to the Nature Index 2020 Science Cities. Notably, Shandong University is one of China's most prestigious universities as a member of the former Project 985 and the current Double First Class University Plan.

Universities and colleges    
Qilu Normal University (formerly Shandong Educational Institute)
Qilu University of Technology (or Shandong Polytechnic University)
Shandong Architectural Institute
Shandong College of Electronic Technology
Shandong Jiaotong University
Shandong Normal University
Shandong Polytechnic (formerly Jinan Railway Polytechnic)
Shandong Sport University
Shandong University
Shandong University of Art and Design
Shandong University of Arts
Shandong University of Finance and Economics
 Shandong University of Science and Technology, which also has campuses in Qingdao and Tai'an.
Shandong University of Traditional Chinese Medicine
Shandong Women's University
University of Jinan

Provincial high schools
 Shandong Experimental High School
 Jinan Foreign Language School
 The High School Affiliated to Shandong Normal University

Sports
The most renowned sports team in Jinan is Shandong Hi-Speed Kirin. They have been playing in the Chinese Basketball Association (CBA) since 1995. In the 2012–13 CBA season they reached the final, but lost 4–0 to Guangdong Southern Tigers.

The Shandong Taishan Football Club is the most widely known football team in Jinan. The club currently plays in the highest tier of Chinese football, the Chinese Super League. They have been playing in the top tier for every season since the league became professional in 1994. Shandong Taishan has won five top division titles, eight Chinese FA Cups, and one Chinese FA Super Cup. Jinan was also one of four host cities of China during the 2004 AFC Asian Cup.

In 2009, Jinan hosted the 2009 National Games of China, the premier sports event at the national level in China and the first major multi-sports event held in China after the 2008 Summer Olympics in Beijing. The National Games' main venue was the Jinan Olympic Sports Center.

Since 2014, Jinan has also been known as the site of China’s national winter swimming festivals at Daming Lake, since 2016 organized in cooperation with the International Winter Swimming Association (IWSA). In the 2019–20 season, Jinan hosted the 8th Winter Springs-swimming International Invitational.

Twin towns and sister cities

  Augsburg, Bavaria, Germany (January 29, 2004)
  Coventry, England, United Kingdom (May 5, 1983)
  Joondalup, Western Australia, Australia (September 4, 2004)
  Kazanlak, Stara Zagora Province, Bulgaria (January 21, 2013)
  Kharkiv, Ukraine (July 31, 2006)
  Kfar Saba, Israel (July 16, 2007)
  Marmaris, Muğla Province, Turkey (September 19, 2011)
  Nizhny Novgorod, Russia (September 22, 1994)
  Port Moresby, Papua New Guinea (February 29, 1988)
  Porto Velho, State of Rondônia, Brazil (September 19, 2011)
  Praia, Santiago Island, Cape Verde (April 9, 2009)
  Regina, Saskatchewan, Canada (January 29, 1985)
  Rennes, Brittany Region, France March 24, 2000)
  Sacramento, California, United States (October 2, 1984)
  Suwon, Gyeonggi Province, South Korea (June 16, 1993)
  Vantaa, Uusimaa, Finland (December 22, 2000)
  Vitebsk, Belarus (August 17, 2009)
  Wakayama, Honshu, Japan (April 20, 1982)
  Yamaguchi, Honshu, Japan (March 22, 1985)
  Nagpur, Maharashtra, India (December 8, 2017)
  Arba Minch, Southern Nations, Nationalities, and Peoples' Region, Ethiopia (September 4, 2018)

See also
 List of twin towns and sister cities in China
Shandong Province

Notes

References

Bibliography

External links

Jinan Government website
Compass foreign business service center

Yellow River
50 Scenes of the Yellow River in China
Three Must-go Tourist Spots in Jinan
 Lixia Pavilion
The Yellow River Forest Park

 
Cities in Shandong
Sub-provincial cities in the People's Republic of China
Provincial capitals in China
Winter swimming
Populated places with period of establishment missing
Prefecture-level divisions of Shandong